Duncan Charles Arsenault (born August 28, 1974, in Worcester, Massachusetts, U.S.) is a multi-instrumentalist and the drummer for the American rock bands The Curtis Mayflower, The Curtain Society, Sam James, Big Eyed Rabbit, and Scott Ricciuti & Pistol Whipped . His solo electronic music project has been featured on the CBS television program NCIS and The Young and the Restless. The Marshall Pass's music will appear in the independent film American Mongrel,.

Duncan performs and records with The Curtis Mayflower, Big Eyed Rabbit, and The Curtain Society.

Collaborations
Arsenault drums with Shana Morrison, daughter of Van Morrison, and has also played drums with author, poet, musician Jim Carroll. Arsenault and The Curtain Society have also performed backing up Mark Burgess from The Chameleons.

Discography

The Curtis Mayflower
 Death Hoax - 2017
 Fourth Wall (single) - 2014
 King of the Fools (single) - 2014
 American Mongrel Soundtrack Album - 2014
 Everything Beautiful Is Under Attack - January 2014
 Live at The Dive EP February 2013

The Marshall Pass
 Wordless Prayer August 18, 2020
 Ghost Land September 15, 2019
 Angel Dream (Tom Petty cover) (single) February 2018
 No Second Thoughts (Tom Petty cover) (single) February 2018
 Maggie (single) April 2015
 Phantom Train December 2012

Cowboy & Lady
 Take Me To Town - April 2016

Sam James
Fix This Mess - November 2012

Big Eyed Rabbit
 Live At The Stomping Ground - November 2013
 Big Eyed Rabbit - August 2012

Scott Ricciuti & Pistol Whipped
 Like The Red Haunts The Wine - April 2012

Beg, Scream & Shout!
 No Amount of Alcohol - April 2011

James Keyes
To The Earth (Volume IV, Estival) - 2017
To The Earth (Volume III, Vernal) - 2017
To The Earth (Volume II, Hibernal) - 2017
To The Earth (Volume I, Autumnal) - 2017
The Middle - 2013
Devil Take The Hindmost - 2011

Zack Borer
Home - May 2007

The Al Arsenault Blues Band
 Hat Full of Blues - 2007

The Curtain Society

Albums
 Every Corner of the Room - Orcaphat Records - 2005
 Life is Long, Still - Bedazzled Records - 1996
 Inertia - Bedazzled Records - 1995

EPs
 Volume, Tone, Tempo - Bedazzled Records - 2000

Singles, compilations
 Birds Fly Information, Boston Does Boston Vol 1&2, 2013
 Every Corner of the Room - Worcester Magazine Turtle Boy Music Awards CD 2008
 Sleigh Ride - A Very Local Christmas 2003, Bedazzled Records X-Mas Disc 1997
 No Wonder - It's Your Local Music 2002
 Plaster - Several Bands Galore - Claire Records 1998
 Swing/Evanston - Splashed with Many a Speck - Dewdrops Records 1997
 Riverful Losing Today Magazine 1997
 Mouthwithout (version 2) - Nigh - Castle von Buhler Records 1997
 Mouthwithout b/w Swamp Thing - 7" vinyl - Bedazzled Records 1997
 Ferris Wheel - Radio Hepcats Vol. 1 1996
 Gravity - Anon - Castle von Buhler Records 1995
 Cradle - Woke Up Smiling - Bedazzled Records 1995
 Love Ends - Soon - Castle von Buhler Records 1994

Other appearances
Solo - God Rest Ye Merry Gentlemen A Very Local Christmas 2003
Drums - Mike Duffy 'Destined to be a Rumor' (cd)
Drums - Daniel Roughan (cd)
Drums - Tim Hansen 'Bless My Soul' (cd)
Drums - Denis Coughlan (cd)

External links
Official Curtain Society website
Official The Marshall Pass website
Official The Curtis Mayflower website
Official Big Eyed Rabbit website
Official Scott Ricciuti & Pistol Whipped website
Beg, Scream & Shout! official website
Sam James official website
Official site

Additional information
 Voted 1 of the 26 people to watch in 2006 in The Pulse Magazine.
 Worcester Magazine Interview July 2010

References 

American rock drummers
Living people
1974 births
Musicians from Worcester, Massachusetts
20th-century American drummers
American male drummers
21st-century American drummers
20th-century American male musicians
21st-century American male musicians